Pioneer Trail may refer to:

 The Pioneer Trail, video game
 Pioneer Trail (film), 1938 American film